The Padres Paradise Series was a three-game Major League Baseball regular season series between the San Diego Padres and St. Louis Cardinals at Aloha Stadium in Honolulu, Hawaii, on April 19 and 20, 1997. These were the first regular-season major league games played in Hawaii. The Padres were the home team for all three games. The Cardinals won the opening two games (a twi-night doubleheader) on April 19, winning the first 1–0 and the second 2–1. The Padres won the third game on April 20 by a score of 8–2. Reported attendances were 37,382 (games 1 & 2) and 40,050 (game 3).

The Padres front office saw the series as a test run for future exhibition games in Hawaii. The Padres had played an exhibition series at Aloha Stadium in 1975 against Japan's Seibu Lions. The Padres arrived in Hawaii with an 8–5 record. The three-game series began a stretch in which they lost 10 of 11 and dropped below .500 for the rest of the season.

Participating teams 
The Padres first asked the Houston Astros to move a series from San Diego to Honolulu, but the Astros declined. The Padres then turned to the Cardinals.

Rosters

St. Louis Cardinals 1997 roster

San Diego Padres 1997 roster

Venue

Broadcasting 
The Sunday game was nationally televised on ESPN's Sunday Night Baseball.

Series summary 
The series was composed of three Padres regular season home games relocated from San Diego.

Game 1 
The first game was held on Saturday, April 19, 1997 at 4:09 p.m. HST.

Game 2 
The second game was held on Saturday, April 19, 1997 at 7:17 p.m. HST.

Game 3 
The third game was held on Sunday, April 20, 1997 at 2:05 p.m. HST.

See also 
 List of neutral site regular season Major League Baseball games played in the United States and Canada
 List of Major League Baseball games played outside the United States and Canada

References

External links 
 
 
 

1997 Major League Baseball season
Baseball in Hawaii
Major League Baseball competitions
San Diego Padres
St. Louis Cardinals